Saanen District was one of the 26 administrative districts in the canton of Bern, Switzerland. Its capital was the municipality of Saanen. The district had an area of 241 km² and consisted of 3 municipalities:

External links
Official website of Saanen municipality

References

Former districts of the canton of Bern